Miguel Ángel González Suárez (born 24 December 1947), known as Miguel Ángel, is a Spanish former footballer who played as a goalkeeper.

Club career
Miguel Ángel was born in Ourense, Galicia. During his career, after making his beginnings at handball, he played for AD Couto (later renamed Atlético Orense), CD Castellón and Real Madrid, having an 18-year spell with the latter club and being first choice from 1974 to 1978 and in two of his final three seasons; he conquered six La Liga championships, being an active part in four of those.

Miguel Ángel retired in June 1986, at the age of nearly 39. Subsequently, he remained attached to Real in several capacities.

International career
Miguel Ángel earned 18 caps for the Spain national team, and was in the squad for the 1978 and 1982 FIFA World Cups. His debut came on 12 October 1975 in a 2–0 win against Denmark for the UEFA Euro 1976 qualifying phase, held in Barcelona.

Personal life
On 17 December 2022, Miguel Ángel was diagnosed with ALS. Real Madrid expressed support for his fight against the disease in an official statement.

Honours
Real Madrid
La Liga: 1971–72, 1974–75, 1975–76, 1977–78, 1978–79, 1979–80
Copa del Rey: 1969–70, 1973–74, 1974–75, 1979–80, 1981–82
Copa de la Liga: 1985
UEFA Cup: 1984–85

Individual
Ricardo Zamora Trophy: 1975–76
Don Balón Award: 1975–76

References

External links

1947 births
Living people
Spanish footballers
Footballers from Ourense
Association football goalkeepers
La Liga players
Segunda División players
Tercera División players
CD Castellón footballers
Real Madrid CF players
UEFA Cup winning players
Spain amateur international footballers
Spain international footballers
1978 FIFA World Cup players
1982 FIFA World Cup players
Real Madrid CF non-playing staff